The Marriage Speculation is a 1917 comedy-drama film directed by Ashley Miller.

Plot

Mr. Cliday is an old man who has saved $10,000 after 20 years of employment at a pickle factory. He decides to invest the money in young Clara Wilson's education if she agrees to marry a rich man who will ensure that Mr. Cliday has enough money to support himself for the rest of his life. However, this means that Clara Wilson has to leave her current lover, Billie Perkins. Clara does not like any of the men who Cliday wants her to marry, but she nonetheless agrees to marry an Italian count. By the time of the wedding, Billy is able to pay Mr. Cliday the money needed to insure his retirement. At the wedding, Billy wears a disguise to look like the count. Clara doesn't realize this until well into the ceremony. Mr. Cliday also relieves her of her obligation to marry a rich man, and the film ends.

Cast
Charles Kent as Mr. Cliday
Mildred Manning as Clara Wilson
Wallace MacDonald as Billie Perkins

References

External links

1917 films
1917 comedy-drama films
American black-and-white films
American silent feature films
1910s English-language films
1910s American films
Silent American comedy-drama films